Julien Jousse (born 21 January 1986 in Les Issambres) is a professional racing driver from France.

Career

Formula Ford
After spending time in karting between 1997 and 2001, Jousse began has circuit racing career in 2002 in the Formula Ford Kent series. In the three races he contested he took three podium finishes, including one race win. In 2003 he moved to the French Formula Ford series, taking a single podium place to finish the year in 9th place. He also took part in the end-of-season Formula Ford Festival at Brands Hatch, finishing in 17th position.

Formula Renault
For 2004, Jousse moved up to the French Formula Renault 2.0 championship with Hexis Racing. During his first season he took one podium finish to end the year in 14th place. He continued in the series for 2005, switching to the front running SG Formula team. He took three podium places, including a debut win at Magny-Cours, to finish 6th in the standings. He also took part in six Eurocup Formula Renault 2.0 races, scoring twelve points on his way to 21st overall.

Jousse stayed in French Formula Renault for a third season in 2006, securing a win and three further podiums on his way to third in the final standings. He also took part in a further two Eurocup Formula Renault 2.0 races, although he failed to score a point.

For 2007, Jousse stepped up to the Formula Renault 3.5 Series with the French Tech 1 Racing team. He finished the year in 10th place overall, taking one pole position, a fastest lap and three podium finishes during the season. In a very successful year his team-mate, Portugal's Álvaro Parente, won the drivers' championship with Tech 1 Racing taking the Teams' title.

Jousse stayed with the team for a second season in 2008, where he was joined by fellow countryman and Formula Renault graduate Charles Pic. He finished as runner-up in the championship, behind Giedo van der Garde, after taking six podium places including his first series win in the final round at Barcelona. He also helped Tech 1 Racing secure their second consecutive Teams' championship.

Formula Two
After taking part in off-season GP2 testing with Fisichella Motor Sport and Trident Racing, Jousse joined the newly revived FIA Formula Two Championship for the 2009 season, driving car number four. He finished fifth in standings with a win coming at Donington Park.

Superleague Formula
Jousse raced in the Superleague Formula series in 2009 at the last two rounds of the season driving for A.S. Roma replacing ex-IndyCar Series driver Franck Perera. He got a podium in his debut race at the Monza round.

NASCAR
Jousse competed in one NASCAR K&N Pro Series West event in 2012.

ARCA Racing Series
Jousse competed in one ARCA Racing Series race in 2013 season.

Racing record

Career summary

Complete Formula Renault 3.5 Series results
(key) (Races in bold indicate pole position) (Races in italics indicate fastest lap)

Complete FIA Formula Two Championship results
(key) (Races in bold indicate pole position) (Races in italics indicate fastest lap)

Superleague Formula

2009
(Races in bold indicate pole position) (Races in italics indicate fastest lap)

2009 Super Final results
Super Final results in 2009 did not count for points towards the main championship.

2010

FIA GT competition results

GT1 World Championship results

FIA GT Series results

24 Hours of Le Mans results

References

External links
Official website 
Career details from Driver Database
 

1986 births
Living people
French racing drivers
Formula Renault Eurocup drivers
French Formula Renault 2.0 drivers
FIA Formula Two Championship drivers
European Le Mans Series drivers
Superleague Formula drivers
World Series Formula V8 3.5 drivers
FIA GT1 World Championship drivers
24 Hours of Le Mans drivers
FIA World Endurance Championship drivers
Blancpain Endurance Series drivers
24 Hours of Spa drivers
NASCAR drivers
ARCA Menards Series drivers
Status Grand Prix drivers
SG Formula drivers
Tech 1 Racing drivers
Pescarolo Sport drivers
De Villota Motorsport drivers
Alan Docking Racing drivers